Josh Barlow may refer to:
 Josh Barlow (rugby league)
 Josh Barlow (footballer)